Élodie Brouiller (born 23 July 1987) is a French former competitive ice dancer. With Benoît Richaud, she competed at two World Junior Championships, placing 13th in 2006 and 7th in 2007. Brouiller/Richaud won two medals on the ISU Junior Grand Prix series and qualified for the JGP Final in 2006. They ended their partnership in 2007. 

From 2002 to 2005, Brouiller competed with Lionel Rumi.

Competitive highlights
(with Richaud)

References 

 

French female ice dancers
Living people
1987 births
Sportspeople from Saint-Étienne
21st-century French women